Blitzkreuz is the fourth studio album by German metalcore band Callejon. It entered the German Media Control Charts at number 9.

Track listing

Credits 
Guest musicians
 K.I.Z on "Porn from Spain 2"
 "Mille" Petrozza (Kreator) on "Porn from Spain 2"
 Sebastian Madsen (Madsen) on "Porn from Spain 2"

Charts

References

External links 
 
 Blitzkreuz at Callejon's official website

2012 albums
Callejon (band) albums